A Man's World is a 1942 American drama film, directed by Charles Barton. It stars William Wright, Marguerite Chapman, and Larry Parks, and was released on September 17, 1942.

Cast list
 William Wright as Dan O'Driscoll
 Marguerite Chapman as Mona Jackson (aka Mona Smith)
 Larry Parks as Chick O'Driscoll
 Wynne Gibson as Blossom Donovan
 Roger Pryor as Bugsy Nelson
 Frank Sully as Sammy Collins
 Ferris Taylor as Chief DeShon
 Edward Van Sloan as Doc Stone
 Clancy Cooper as John Black
 James Millican as Parks
 Lloyd Bridges as Brown
 Al Hill as Eddie Dartlett
 Ralph Peters as Vince Carrol
 Alan Bridge as Capt. Peterson
 Eddie Kane as Doc Drake
 Beulah Parkington as Girl
 Grace Lenard as Girl
 Diana Snyder as Girl
 Thelma White as Girl
 Frank Richards as Thomas
 Shirley Patterson as Nurse Bentley

References

External links
 

Columbia Pictures films
Films directed by Charles Barton
American black-and-white films
American drama films
1942 drama films
1942 films
1940s American films